In present-day Spain a mancomunidad (in English "commonwealth" or municipal association) is an association of municipalities voluntarily established by some municipalities with the aim of carrying out joint projects or providing common services. A mancomunidad is a legal personality, and can exist either for a particular period to achieve a concrete goal or can exist indefinitely.

A Spanish mancomunidad is one of the local entities defined for the purpose of local government, to which those municipalities may voluntarily delegate some of their functions and powers. It is similar to a comarca, with the difference that comarca has somewhat different meanings in the various autonomous communities of Spain and mancomunidad is defined identically throughout the country. The municipalities in a single mancomunidad need not be coterminous (though they usually are). They are required to set a clear goal, create management bodies distinct from those of the individual municipalities, and provide the mancomunidad with its own budget.

Purpose
In general, mancomunidades are aimed at carrying out joint projects or providing common services 

There are a number of natural or historical regions that, despite of the strong identity and common goals of their inhabitants, are divided by provincial or even ancient kingdom borders. Examples of such regions are Tierra de Campos, Manchuela and Ilercavonia.
Such regions or comarcas have often not been able to achieve the necessary legal recognition for their administrative development within the existing provincial or autonomous frameworks. Therefore, their municipalities have resorted to organizing themselves into a mancomunidad.

Other groups of municipalities that don't face the problem of borders cutting across their natural region of comarca may form a mancomunidad for economical purposes, to improve local services or in order alleviate some form of historical administrative neglect owing to distance from and lack of communication with current administrative centers.

Other uses
The term mancomunidad and its cognates are also used to translate the English word "commonwealth".

References

Bibliography

External links 
  Mancomunidades in Spain, interactive map.
 Mancomunidad Tierra de Caballeros
 Web Mancomunidad Terra de Celanova

 
Government of Spain
Forms of local government